Michael Brad Moss (born February 5, 1971) is an American bridge player from Berkeley, California and New York City. He is the son of Gail Greenberg.

Bridge accomplishments

Awards

 ACBL King or Queen of Bridge (1) 1989
 ACBL Player of the Year (1) 2010
 Goren Trophy (1) 2010

Wins
 Bermuda Bowl (1) 2017
 World Championship Rosenblum Teams (1) 2010
 North American Bridge Championships (14)
 Nail Life Master Open Pairs (1) 1993 
 Grand National Teams (1) 1993 
 Jacoby Open Swiss Teams (1) 2010 
 Roth Open Swiss Teams (1) 2012 
 Mitchell Board-a-Match Teams (2) 1998, 2018 
 Chicago Mixed Board-a-Match (1) 1991 
 Reisinger (1) 2001 
 Spingold (3) 2005, 2010, 2016 
 Von Zedtwitz Life Master Pairs (1) 2019
 Vanderbilt Trophy (2) 2018, 2023

Runners-up

 North American Bridge Championships (12)
 von Zedtwitz Life Master Pairs (1) 1999 
 Lebhar IMP Pairs (1) 1995 
 Blue Ribbon Pairs (1) 1992 
 Nail Life Master Open Pairs (1) 2010 
 Jacoby Open Swiss Teams (2) 2002, 2015 
 Vanderbilt (2) 2009, 2012 
 Reisinger (1) 2006 
 Spingold (2) 2000, 2013 
 Keohane North American Swiss Teams (1) 2021

References

External links

 

1971 births
American contract bridge players
Sportspeople from Berkeley, California
Sportspeople from New York City
Living people
Place of birth missing (living people)